Ronald Steel (3 June 1929 – 1 November 2009) was an English footballer who made 66 appearances in the Football League playing on the wing for Darlington. He also played non-league football for clubs including Bishop Auckland, Headington United, with whom he won the 1952–53 Southern League title, Bedford Town, Banbury Spencer and Witney Town.

References

1929 births
2009 deaths
People from Newburn
Footballers from Tyne and Wear
English footballers
Association football forwards
Bishop Auckland F.C. players
Darlington F.C. players
Oxford United F.C. players
Bedford Town F.C. players
Banbury United F.C. players
Witney Town F.C. players
English Football League players
Southern Football League players